The Hunter's Point crane is a gantry crane located at the naval shipyard in Hunters Point, San Francisco. When it was built, in 1947 to repair battleships and aircraft carriers, it was the largest crane in the world.

It has a  capacity and was completed at the site by the American Bridge Company.

When it was first built, it was used to lift 630 tons, which the San Francisco Chronicle reported at the time was the heaviest load ever lifted.

In 1959, it was used for Operation Skycatch, where dummy Polaris missiles were fired and caught via a string of arresting cables, before being lowered to the ground for testing. Previous versions of the test had the missiles flung out into the bay and retrieved from the ocean floor.

A large trapezoidal frame was erected atop the gantry crane for the UGM-73 Poseidon missile test facility; the structural members were lifted by Marine Boss in 1967. The crane dominates the landscape in the area, as it is easily visible from miles around.

Today, the site where the crane is located is a superfund site due to contamination by the  military, and there is no public access.

References

Cranes (machines)